Professor James Moriarty is a fictional character and criminal mastermind created by Sir Arthur Conan Doyle to be a formidable enemy for the author's fictional detective Sherlock Holmes. He was created primarily as a device by which Doyle could kill Holmes and end the hero's stories. Professor Moriarty first appears in the short story "The Adventure of the Final Problem", first published in The Strand Magazine in December 1893.  He also plays a role in the final Sherlock Holmes novel The Valley of Fear, but without a direct appearance.  Holmes mentions Moriarty in five other stories: "The Adventure of the Empty House", "The Adventure of the Norwood Builder", "The Adventure of the Missing Three-Quarter", "The Adventure of the Illustrious Client", and "His Last Bow".

Moriarty is a criminal mastermind who uses his intelligence and resources to provide criminals with crime strategies and sometimes protection from the law, all in exchange for a fee or a cut of profit. Holmes likens Moriarty to a spider at the center of a web and calls him the "Napoleon of crime", a phrase Doyle lifted from a Scotland Yard inspector referring to Adam Worth, a real-life criminal mastermind and one of the individuals upon whom the character of Moriarty was based. Despite appearing only twice in Doyle's original stories, later adaptations and pastiches have often given Moriarty greater prominence and treated him as Sherlock Holmes' archenemy.

Appearances in works
Professor Moriarty's first appearance occurred in the 1893 short story "The Adventure of the Final Problem" (set in 1891). The story features consulting detective Sherlock Holmes revealing to his friend and biographer Doctor Watson that for years now he has suspected many seemingly isolated crimes to actually all be the machinations of a single, vast, and subtle criminal organisation. After investigation, he has uncovered Professor Moriarty as a mastermind who provides strategy and protection to criminals in exchange for obedience and a share in their profits. Moriarty realizes Holmes is aware of his operation and confronts him in person, threatening death if further interference is done.

Holmes describes Moriarty's physical appearance to Watson, saying the professor is extremely tall and thin, clean-shaven, pale, and ascetic-looking. He has a forehead that "domes out in a white curve", deeply sunken eyes, and shoulders that are "rounded from much study". His face protrudes forward and is always slowly oscillating from side to side "in a curiously reptilian fashion". Holmes mentions that during their meeting, Moriarty remarked in surprise, "You have less frontal development than I should have expected," indicating the criminal believes in phrenology.

Holmes ignores the threat and delivers appropriate evidence to the police so Moriarty and those who operate his network will face justice in a few days. Knowing the mastermind and his trusted lieutenants intend to kill him before they hide or are arrested, Holmes flees to Switzerland, and Watson joins him. The mastermind follows, his pursuit ending when he confronts Holmes at the top of the Reichenbach Falls. Watson does not witness the confrontation but arrives later to find signs of hand-to-hand combat occurring at the cliff edge near the waterfall, indicating the battle ended with both men falling to their deaths. Watson also finds a goodbye note left behind by Holmes that Moriarty allowed him to write before their battle.

Moriarty plays a direct role in only one other Holmes story, The Valley of Fear (1914), set before "The Final Problem" but written afterwards. In The Valley of Fear, Holmes attempts to prevent Moriarty's men from committing a murder. A policeman who interviewed Moriarty tells Holmes that the professor has a painting by Jean-Baptiste Greuze hanging on his office wall. Learning this, Holmes mentions the great value of another painting by the same artist, pointing out such works could not have been purchased on a university professor's salary. The gallery believed Adam Worth (the criminal who helped inspire Doyle to create Moriarty) was responsible, but was unable to prove the claim.

Holmes mentions Moriarty reminiscently in five other stories: "The Adventure of the Empty House" (the immediate sequel to "The Final Problem"), "The Adventure of the Norwood Builder", "The Adventure of the Missing Three-Quarter", "The Adventure of the Illustrious Client", and "His Last Bow" (the final adventure in Holmes's canon timeline, taking place years after he has officially retired).

Doctor Watson, even when narrating, never meets Moriarty (only getting distant glimpses of him in "The Final Problem") and relies upon Holmes to relate accounts of the detective's feud with the criminal. Doyle is inconsistent on Watson's familiarity with Moriarty. In "The Final Problem", Watson tells Holmes he has never heard of Moriarty, while in "The Valley of Fear", set earlier on, Watson already knows of him as "the famous scientific criminal."

In "The Empty House", Holmes says Moriarty commissioned a powerful air gun from a blind German mechanic surnamed von Herder, a weapon later used by the professor's employee/acolyte Colonel Moran. It closely resembles a cane, allows easy concealment, is capable of firing revolver bullets at long range, and makes very little noise when fired, making it ideal for criminal sniping. Moriarty also has a marked preference for organising lethal "accidents" to befall his targets. His attempts to kill Holmes include falling masonry and a speeding horse-drawn vehicle. He is also responsible for stage-managing the death of Birdy Edwards, making it appear the man was lost overboard while sailing to South Africa.

Personality
Moriarty is highly ruthless, shown by his steadfast vow to Sherlock Holmes that "if you are clever enough to bring destruction upon me, rest assured that I shall do as much to you". Moriarty is categorised by Holmes as an extremely powerful criminal mastermind adept at committing any atrocity to perfection without losing any sleep over it. It is stated in "The Final Problem" that Moriarty does not directly participate in the activities he plans, but only orchestrates the events or provides the plans that will lead to a successful crime. What makes Moriarty so dangerous is his extremely cunning intellect:

Holmes echoes and expounds this sentiment in The Valley of Fear, stating:

Moriarty respects Holmes's intelligence, stating: "It has been an intellectual treat for me to see the manner in which you [Holmes] have grappled with this case." Nevertheless, he makes numerous attempts upon Holmes's life through his agents. He shows a fiery disposition, becoming enraged when his plans are thwarted, resulting in his being placed "in positive danger of losing my liberty". While personally pursuing Holmes at a train station, he furiously elbows aside passengers, heedless of whether this draws attention to himself.

Doyle's original motive in creating Moriarty was evidently his intention to kill Holmes off. "The Final Problem" was intended to be exactly what its title says; Doyle sought to sweeten the pill by letting Holmes go in a blaze of glory, having rid the world of a criminal so powerful and dangerous that any further task would be trivial in comparison (as Holmes says in the story itself). Eventually, however, public pressure and financial troubles impelled Doyle to bring Holmes back. While Doyle conceded to revealing that Holmes did not die during "The Final Problem" (as Watson mistakenly concludes), he chose not to undo Moriarty's death in a similar fashion. For this reason, the later novel The Valley of Fear features Moriarty as an active villain but is specified to take place before the events of "The Final Problem".

Fictional character biography
As established in Doyle's canon, Moriarty first gains recognition at the age of 21 for writing "a treatise upon the Binomial Theorem", which leads to his being awarded the Mathematical Chair at one of England's smaller universities. Moriarty later authors a much respected work titled The Dynamics of an Asteroid. After he becomes the subject of unspecified "dark rumours" in the university town, he is compelled to resign his teaching post and leave the area. He moves to London, where he establishes himself as an "army coach", a private tutor to officers preparing for exams. He becomes a consulting criminal mastermind for various London gangs and criminals (it is uncertain if he was already doing this before leaving his teaching post). When multiple plans of his are hampered or undone by Sherlock Holmes, Moriarty targets the consulting detective.

Multiple pastiches and other works outside of Doyle's stories purport to provide additional information about Moriarty's background. John F. Bowers, a lecturer in mathematics at the University of Leeds, wrote a tongue-in-cheek article in 1989 in which he assesses Moriarty's contributions to mathematics and gives a detailed description of Moriarty's background, including a statement that Moriarty was born in Ireland (an idea based on the fact that the surname is Irish in origin). The 2005 pastiche novel Sherlock Holmes: The Unauthorized Biography also reports that Moriarty was born in Ireland, and states that he was employed as a professor by Durham University. According to the 2020 audio drama Sherlock Holmes: The Voice of Treason, written by George Mann and Cavan Scott, Moriarty was a professor at Stonyhurst College (where Arthur Conan Doyle was educated and knew two students with the surname Moriarty).

Family
The stories give contradictory indications about Moriarty's family. In his first appearance in "The Final Problem" (1893), the villain is referred to only as "Professor Moriarty". Watson mentions no forename but does refer to the name of another family member when he writes of "the recent letters in which Colonel James Moriarty defends the memory of his brother". In "The Adventure of the Empty House" (1903), Holmes refers to Moriarty as "Professor James Moriarty". This is the only time Moriarty is given a first name, and oddly, it is the same as that of his purported brother. In the 1914 novel The Valley of Fear (written after the preceding two stories, but set earlier), Holmes says of Professor Moriarty: "He is unmarried. His younger brother is a station master in the west of England." In Sherlock Holmes: A Drama in Four Acts, an 1899 stage play, of which Doyle was a co-author, the villain is named Professor Robert Moriarty.

Writer Vincent Starrett suggested that Moriarty could have one brother (who is both a colonel and station master) or two brothers (one a colonel and the other a station master); he added that he considered the presence of two siblings more likely, and suggested that all three brothers were named James. Writer Leslie S. Klinger that suggested Professor Moriarty has an older brother named Colonel James Moriarty in addition to an unnamed younger brother. According to Klinger, writer Ian McQueen proposed that Moriarty does not actually have any brothers, while Sherlockian John Bennett Shaw suggested, like Starrett, that there are three Moriarty brothers, all named James. The premise that Professor James Moriarty has two brothers also named James was used in the radio series The Further Adventures of Sherlock Holmes, the manga and anime series Moriarty the Patriot and the Kim Newman novel Moriarty: The Hound of the D'Urbervilles.

Adaptations
In addition to his appearances in Doyle's stories, there are many examples of Professor Moriarty in other media.

Real-world role models

"Moriarty" is an ancient Irish name as is Moran, the surname of Moriarty's henchman, Sebastian Moran. Doyle himself was of Irish Catholic descent, educated at Stonyhurst College, although he abandoned his family's religious tradition, neither marrying nor raising his children in the Catholic faith, nor cleaving to any politics that his ethnic background might presuppose. Doyle is known to have used his experiences at Stonyhurst as inspiration for details of the Holmes series; among his contemporaries at the school were two boys surnamed Moriarty.

ln addition to the master criminal Adam Worth, there has been much speculation among astronomers and Sherlock Holmes enthusiasts that Doyle based his fictional character Moriarty on the Canadian-American astronomer Simon Newcomb. Newcomb was revered as a multitalented genius, with a special mastery of mathematics, and he had become internationally famous in the years before Doyle began writing his stories. More to the point, Newcomb had earned a reputation for spite and malice, apparently seeking to destroy the careers and reputations of rival scientists.

Moriarty may have been inspired in part by two real-world mathematicians. If the characterisations of Moriarty's academic papers are reversed, they describe real mathematical events. Carl Friedrich Gauss wrote a famous paper on the dynamics of an asteroid in his early 20s, and was appointed to a chair partly on the strength of this result. Srinivasa Ramanujan wrote about generalisations of the binomial theorem, and earned a reputation as a genius by writing articles that confounded the best extant mathematicians. Gauss's story was well known in Doyle's time, and Ramanujan's story unfolded at Cambridge from early 1913 to mid 1914; The Valley of Fear, which contains the comment about maths so abstruse that no one could criticise it, was published in September 1914. Irish mathematician Des MacHale has suggested George Boole may have been a model for Moriarty.

Jane Stanford, in That Irishman, suggests that Doyle borrowed some of the traits and background of the Fenian John O'Connor Power for his portrayal of Moriarty. In Moriarty Unmasked: Conan Doyle and an Anglo-Irish Quarrel, 2017, Stanford explores Doyle's relationship with the Irish literary and political community in London. She suggests that Moriarty, Ireland's Napoleon, represents the Fenian threat at the heart of the British Empire. O'Connor Power studied at St Jarlath's Diocesan College in Tuam, County Galway. In his third and last year he was Professor of Humanities. As an ex-professor, the Fenian leader successfully made a bid for a Westminster seat in County Mayo.

It is averred that surviving Jesuit priests at the preparatory school Hodder Place, Stonyhurst, instantly recognised the physical description of Moriarty as that of the Rev. Thomas Kay, SJ, Prefect of Discipline, under whose authority Doyle fell as a wayward pupil. According to this hypothesis, Doyle as a private joke has Inspector MacDonald describe Moriarty: "He'd have made a grand meenister with his thin face and grey hair and his solemn-like way of talking."

The model which Doyle himself cited (through Sherlock Holmes) in The Valley of Fear is the London arch-criminal of the 18th century, Jonathan Wild. He mentions this when seeking to compare Moriarty to a real-world character that Inspector Alec MacDonald might know, but it is in vain as MacDonald is not so well read as Holmes.

Legacy
T. S. Eliot's character Macavity the Mystery Cat is based on Moriarty.

A Sherlockian society was formed by noted Sherlockian John Bennett Shaw called "The Brothers Three of Moriarty", in honour of Professor Moriarty and his two brothers. The group held annual dinners in Moriarty, New Mexico.

See also
 List of actors who have played Professor Moriarty

References

External links
 The Final Problem
 The Valley of Fear
 Sherlock Holmes Public Library
 

America's Best Comics characters
Crime film characters
Literary characters introduced in 1893
Fictional crime bosses
Fictional gentleman thieves
Fictional mathematicians
Fictional professors
Fictional scientists
Sherlock Holmes characters
Fictional English people
Male characters in film
Male characters in literature
Male characters in television
Male literary villains
Male film villains